is a passenger railway station located in the city of Matsuyama, Ehime Prefecture, Japan. It is operated by the private transportation company Iyotetsu.

Lines

Layout
The station is an above-ground station with two opposed side platforms and two tracks connected by a level crossing. The station is attended. There used to be third track, but it has been removed and the site is now a flowerbed. There are Iyotetsu bus and Iyotetsu taxi stands in front of the station. On the Gunchū Line, in the event of an accident resulting in injury or death, vehicle failure, or signal trouble, the train will return to this station or Masaki Station.  During most of the day, trains arrive every fifteen minutes.

History
Yōgo Station was opened on July 4, 1896. The station building was rebuilt in 2015.

Surrounding area
The station is located in a suburban residential area.
Matsuyama City Hall Yodo Branch
Matsuyama Municipal Yodo Elementary School

See also
 List of railway stations in Japan

References

External links

Iyotetsu Gunchū Line
Railway stations in Ehime Prefecture
Railway stations in Japan opened in 1896
Railway stations in Matsuyama, Ehime